Buffalo Bill Dam is a concrete arch-gravity dam on the Shoshone River in the U.S. state of Wyoming.  It is named after the famous Wild West figure William "Buffalo Bill" Cody, who founded the nearby town of Cody and owned much of the land now covered by the reservoir formed by its construction. The dam is part of the Shoshone Project, successor to several visionary schemes promoted by Cody to irrigate the Bighorn Basin and turn it from a semi-arid sagebrush-covered plain to productive agricultural land. Known at the time of its construction as Shoshone Dam, it was renamed in 1946 to honor Cody.

At the time of its completion it was the tallest dam in the world. It was listed on the National Register of Historic Places in 1971 and named a National Historic Civil Engineering Landmark by the American Society of Civil Engineers in 1973. The land around the reservoir is maintained as Buffalo Bill State Park.

Description
It is anchored into Pre-Cambrian granitic rock on either side.

Construction

With the authorization of the Shoshone Project in 1904, Buffalo Bill Dam became one of the earliest projects of the new Bureau of Reclamation. The ambitious project involved the construction of one of the first high concrete dams in the United States. Work began immediately, with drilling for geologic investigation starting in July 1904 and continuing for ten months. Work proceeded concurrently on the construction of an access road up the narrow canyon from Cody. The chosen contractor, Prendergast & Clarkson of Chicago, started work in September 1905, building a camp for workers and starting on a diversion dam, which was to divert the river into a wooden flume, through a tunnel and out through another flume to rejoin the river bed. Two men were killed in the construction of the tunnel. A June 1906 flood destroyed the flume. The delay caused the Bureau of Reclamation to suspend the contractor's contract and to call upon the contractor's bonding company, the U.S. Fidelity and Guaranty Company, to ensure the completion of the work. Little work was done until March 1907. Another flood in July damaged the diversion dam again. Working conditions were harsh, leading to the first strike in Wyoming's history in November, in which workers demanded and received three dollars a day from USF&G.

USF&G delegated responsibility for the work to two new contractors, Locher and Grant Smith and Company,  in March 1908. Work progressed more quickly, with the first concrete pours in April. Spring floods set the project back once again, causing concrete work to be suspended. Concrete work started again in March 1909, and despite more spring flooding that suspended work from July to September, work moved quickly. Another threatened strike was broken when Italian laborers were replaced with Bulgarian workers. Final concrete was poured in January 1910, with a final cost of $1.4 million. Seven construction workers were killed on the project.

Immediately after completion the dam suffered from leakage through the outlet works, leading to low water elevations that exposed mudflats, which soon produced dense blowing dust. Corrective work to valves took until 1915. Problems with the right abutment's outlet works led to their abandonment in 1959. They were sealed in 1961. The reservoir began to lose capacity immediately as a result of the Shoshone's heavy silt load, and the material deposited at the head of the reservoir continued to blow when the reservoir was drawn down.

The new reservoir covered hot springs at the forks of the Shoshone, similar to those found at Colter's Hell at the mouth of the Shoshone Canyon.

Shoshone Power Plant

Work on the Shoshone Power Plant started in 1920. Following delays for spring flooding, work on the power house and supply tunnel was complete in 1922, ready for the installation of electrical equipment. Generating units 1 and 2 came on line in 1922, with Unit 3 in 1931. Installed capacity was 6.012 MW. All three units were shut down in 1980, worn out from fifty years of service. 1 and 2 were decommissioned and left in place, while 3 was replaced with a new 3 MW Francis turbine unit that started operation in 1992.

Shoshone Canyon Tunnel  
The proposed Heart Mountain Canal project, intended to irrigate lands to the north of the river, required a new tunnel to direct irrigation waters to a suitable elevation for distribution.  Work on the  Shoshone Canyon Tunnel started in 1937, accompanied by the death of two tunnel workers who were overcome by fumes from explosives and hydrogen sulfide from nearby geothermal activity, and were subsequently struck by construction equipment. A natural cave had to be crossed by a concrete flume of two  spans, constructed under difficult conditions in a high-gas environment. Work on the tunnel by the Utah Construction Company was complete in 1939.

Heart Mountain Power Plant
The Heart Mountain Powerplant was built at the tunnel's outlet in 1947 as a temporary facility. It was rebuilt concurrently with the dam heightening project and is operated on a seasonal basis. It operates a 5 MW Francis turbine on a  head.

Renovation and height increase

Starting in 1985, the crest of the dam was raised , increasing the reservoir's capacity by  when the project was completed in 1993. The spillways were enlarged and equipped with radial arm gates. The project also included a visitor center, located at the north end of the dam's crest. The additional height allowed 25.5 MW of additional generating capacity to be added to the project. The expanded reservoir inundated facilities at  Buffalo Bill State Park, requiring their relocation and reconstruction.

Buffalo Bill Power Plant
The Buffalo Bill Powerplant was built concurrently with the work to increase the dam's height in 1992.

Spirit Mountain Power Plant

The Spirit Mountain Powerplant receives pressurized water through a conduit. It primarily functions to dissipate the pressure in the conduit before it enters an open canal, generating power as a byproduct. The unit operates a Francis turbine generating 4.5 MW on a seasonal base load basis, with a  head. It was built in 1994.

See also

 Pathfinder Dam, a similar and contemporary dam in Wyoming, built of stone masonry due to its distance from concrete supplies
 List of largest reservoirs of Wyoming

References

External links

Buffalo Bill Dam at the U.S. Bureau of Reclamation
Shoshone Project at the U.S. Bureau of Reclamation
Buffalo Bill Dam Visitor Center
Buffalo Bill State Park
Buffalo Bill Dam at the Wyoming State Historic Preservation Office
Buffalo Bill Dam Construction Photographs at the University of Wyoming - American Heritage Center

Buffalo Bill Dam video tour
Park County Archives
Buffalo Bill Dam Construction Photograph Album at the University of Wyoming – American Heritage Center

Dams in Wyoming
Reservoirs in Wyoming
Buildings and structures in Park County, Wyoming
Arch-gravity dams
Hydroelectric power plants in Wyoming
Landforms of Park County, Wyoming
Dams completed in 1910
Dams on the National Register of Historic Places in Wyoming
Historic Civil Engineering Landmarks
Energy infrastructure completed in 1931
Historic American Engineering Record in Wyoming
United States Bureau of Reclamation dams
National Register of Historic Places in Park County, Wyoming